I'll Tell the World may refer to:
 I'll Tell the World (1934 film), an American pre-Code comedy film
 I'll Tell the World (1945 film), an American comedy film